Åke Henriksson Tott (or Achatius Tott; 1598–1640) was a Finnish soldier and politician. His estates included Ekolsund in Sweden, Sjundeby in Finland, Polchow in Swedish Pomerania and Lihula in Swedish Livonia.

He was born in Lohja to Princess Sigrid of Sweden and nobleman Henrik Klasson Tott. He was appointed Privy Councilor in 1630, and Field Marshal in 1631.

In the Thirty Years' War (1618–1648), he commanded troops at the Battle of Grubin, in 1627 and the Battle of Breitenfeld, in 1631. King Gustavus Adolphus of Sweden is said to have called him "the snow plow, who is going to clear the path for the rest".

He married Sigrid Bielke (1607–1634), and fathered Clas Åkesson Tott the younger, and Åke Henrik Åkesson Tott.

Gallery

References
 Nordisk familjebok, 2:a upplagan, Malmö
 Article Tott, Åke in Biografiskt lexikon för Finland (2008).

External links

Find-a-grave link

1598 births
1640 deaths
People from Lohja
Field marshals of Sweden
Finnish people of the Thirty Years' War
Members of the Privy Council of Sweden
Swedish nobility
17th-century Swedish politicians
Swedish-speaking Finns